Oskolishche is a rural locality (a selo) in Volokonovsky District, Belgorod Oblast, Russia. The population was 369 as of 2010. There are 3 streets.

Geography 
Oskolishche is located 12 km south of Volokonovka (the district's administrative centre) by road. Kozlovka is the nearest rural locality.

References 

Rural localities in Volokonovsky District